Reynaldo Garrido (born August 4, 1934) was a tennis player from Havana, Cuba.  

Garrido won the Canadian Open in 1959. He played against his brother Orlando H. Garrido in the final of the tournament.  

Garrido played 5 years for the Cuba Davis Cup team. His best Grand Slam performance was reaching the third round of the 1956 U.S. National Championships. 

Garrido also played jai alai in Cuba and in Miami in the 1960s at the same time that he was the tennis professional at Miami's Jockey Club.

Garrido lives in Miami with his wife Maria Garrido and his two sons: Reynaldo Garrido Jr. and Ricardo Garrido.

External links
 
 

1934 births
Living people
Cuban emigrants to the United States
Cuban male tennis players
Sportspeople from Havana
Tennis players from Miami